Knafeh is a popular traditional Middle Eastern dessert made with spun pastry called kataifi, soaked in a sweet, sugar-based syrup called attar, and typically layered with cheese, or with other ingredients such as clotted cream, pistachio or nuts, depending on the region. It is popular in the Middle East. Variants are also found in Turkey, Greece, and the Balkans.

In Arabic, the name may refer to the string pastry itself, or to the entire dessert dish.

One of the most well-known preparations of knafeh is knafeh Nabulsiyeh, which originated in the city of Nablus, and is the most representative Palestinian dessert.  uses a white-brine cheese called Nabulsi. It is prepared in a large round shallow dish, the pastry is colored with orange or red food coloring, and mostly topped with crushed pistachio nuts.

Etymology
The arabic form, كنافة, transliterates as "knāfa."

Some sources state that it comes from the Coptic Egyptian word , meaning a bread or cake. Early attestations are found in Egyptian stories in the One Thousand and One Nights. Another view is that it comes from a Semitic root with a meaning of "side" or "wing", from the Arabic , "to flank or enclose".

History
A common story is that the dish was created, and prescribed by doctors, to satisfy the hunger of caliphs during Ramadan. The story is variously said to have happened in Fatimid Egypt, or in the Umayyad Caliphate in Syria. It is also reported to have been mentioned in writing as early as the tenth century, and to be of Fatimid origin.

Ibn Sayyar al-Warraq's tenth century  (Book of Dishes), a collection of Arabic and Persian recipes and food advice of the Abbasid caliphs, mentions neither the word , nor a description of the dish as it is known today. However, it does feature a chapter on desserts made with the related , meaning crêpes, from which the Turkish word  and Greek word  derive. In one recipe,  are stuffed with nuts, deep-fried, and topped with honey-sugar syrup, which is essentially unchanged in today's version.

In the later Middle Ages, a new technique was created, with thin batter being dripped onto the metal sheet from a perforated container, creating hair-like strings. A mid-15th century Ottoman Turkish translation of Muhammad bin Hasan al-Baghdadi's  added several new contemporary recipes, including one for this , though it does not specify where it originated. This became the basis for the modern . It is fried together with butter and fillings or toppings such as nuts, sweetened cheese, or clotted cream, and mixed with rosewater and sugar.

Preparation

There are many types of kanafeh pastry:
 khishnah (rough): crust made from long thin noodle threads.
 nāʿimah (fine): semolina dough.
 muhayara (mixed): a mixture of khishnah and na'ama.
 mabruma (twined): It is prepared with noodle.

The pastry is heated in butter, margarine, palm oil, or traditionally semneh and then spread with soft sweet cheese, such as Nabulsi cheese, and topped with more pastry. In khishnah kanafeh the cheese is rolled in the pastry. A thick syrup of sugar, water, and a few drops of rose water or orange blossom water is poured on the pastry during the final minutes of cooking. Often the top layer of pastry is tinted with red or orange food coloring (a modern shortcut, instead of baking it for long periods of time). Crushed pistachios are sprinkled on top as a garnish.

Variants

Kanafeh Nabulsieh 

Kanafeh Nabulsieh originated in the Palestinian city of Nablus, hence the name Nabulsieh. Nablus is still renowned for its kanafeh, which consists of mild white cheese and shredded wheat surface, which is covered by sugar syrup. In the Middle East, this variant of kanafeh is the most common.

Kadayıf and künefe

In the Hatay region of Turkey, which was formerly part of Syria and has a large Arab population, the pastry is called künefe and the wiry shreds are called tel kadayıf. A semi-soft cheese such as Urfa peyniri (cheese of Urfa) or Hatay peyniri (cheese of Hatay), made of raw milk, is used in the filling. In making the künefe, the kadayıf is not rolled around the cheese; instead, cheese is put in between two layers of wiry kadayıf. It is cooked in small copper plates, and then served very hot in syrup with clotted cream (kaymak) and topped with pistachios or walnuts. In the Turkish cuisine, there is also yassı kadayıf and ekmek kadayıfı, none of which is made of wiry shreds. 

The EU Commission approved ‘Antakya Künefesi' from Hatay, Türkiye as Protected Geographical Indication (PGI).

Riştə xətayi
This South Azerbaijani variant is prepared in Tabriz, Iran. Riştə xətayi is typically cooked in Ramadan in the world's biggest covered Bazaar of Tabriz. It is made with chopped walnuts, cinnamon, ginger, powder of rose, sugar, rose water and olive oil.

Kadaif

These very thin threads are also known as "kadaif noodles" and are used to make the outer shell of the Greek dessert kataifi. These vermicelli-like threads become very crispy when fried or baked, which is why the kataifi provides a nice crunch when you bite into it. For this particular Greek dessert, the filling is usually a blend of coarsely chopped nuts, such as walnuts and pistachios, mixed with honey and a light cream.

Gaza knafeh
It originated in Gaza Strip, Palestine, and is made of soft bulgur, cinnamon, pecan nuts, and dairy fats.

World records

The world's largest plate of the dessert was made in Antakya, Turkey, in 2017. The tray of künefe measured 78 meters long, and weighed 1550 kilograms. A previous record attempt was made by rival Nablus in 2009, with a 75-meter tray, weighing 1,350 kilograms. Neither attempt was officially listed as breaking the record; according to the website of the Guinness World Records, there is no current record holder for the title.

See also
 Ekmek kadayıfı, Turkish bread custard
 List of pastries
 Palestinian cuisine
 Phyllo
 Qatayef, a dumpling-like confection involving some of the same ingredients

Gallery

References

External links
 

Arab desserts
Arab pastries
Ottoman cuisine
Egyptian cuisine
Israeli desserts
Jordanian cuisine
Lebanese desserts
Levantine cuisine
Palestinian cuisine
Syrian cuisine
Turkish desserts
Stuffed desserts
Cheese desserts
Albanian cuisine